Ysselsteyn German War Cemetery is a military cemetery interring casualties of the First and Second World Wars. It contains over 31,000 soldiers from around 25 countries, including SS-men and Dutch war criminals. Ysselsteyn is the largest Second World War German cemetery and is the only Nazi-German cemetery in the Netherlands. Following the war, the Nazi soldiers were reburied in the cemetery. The deceased include Germans, Dutch, Poles, and Russians who fought on the side of the Nazis.

World War I and II burials 
Most burials are soldiers killed during the German occupation from May 1940 to May 1945 in the Netherlands. Around 250 of the dead (Nazi-German Wehrmacht and SS, as well as collaborating Dutch), were killed by the Dutch resistance. Around 3,000 of the burials were soldiers detailed to occupation duties, including razzias, deportations, illegal incarceration, Jew-hunting, and other war crimes.  250 more deaths (Wehrmacht) are from the Battle of the Bulge in the Ardennes and Hürtgenwald that were initially interred next to the Netherlands American Cemetery in Margraten.

In a circle near the entrance lie 85 German soldiers who died in World War I and whose bodies floated to the Netherlands down rivers, mainly the Meuse. The Netherlands remained neutral during the First World War.

Over 5,000 unknown burials are located in the cemetery and were marked incorrectly as "Ein Deutscher Soldat" (A German Soldier).

After World War II, all German fatalities were buried there. In 1976 administration was transferred to the German War Graves Commission (Volksbund Deutsche Kriegsgräberfürsorge). The designation as a German burial ground is disputed as many  buried there were non-Germans serving in the German armed forces, comprising 25 nationalities. Dutch, Belgian, Russian, Czech, and many tens of so-called "Volksdeutsche" from Poland, the Danzig Free State, Luxemburg, Slovakia, and even Kazakhstan and Azerbaijan may also be buried there.

Architecture 
Most burials are in individual graves marked by a grey concrete cross that includes (where known) the name, rank, and dates of birth and death. A tall cross stands in the central memorial plaza. Roads extending right and left from the plaza contain a carillon and common graves.

A memorial stone honors Captain Johan Lodewijk Timmermans, a Dutchman who served as manager of the cemetery from 1948 to 1976 on behalf of the Dutch government. Upon his death, his ashes were scattered at the cemetery per his request.

Protests 
From the 1960s, protests were lodged against the German dead and the cemetery. The protests were revived in 2013, when the Dutch Anti-Fascists' League AFVN discovered that since the year 2000, the German ambassador had been holding yearly commemorations there. In 2020, the AFVN started a petition against the visits of the ambassador with Dutch and German Jews joining the effort, along with Beate Klarsfeld and the management of the former Dachau concentration camp. The ambassador ended the practice.

In 2020, the American Ambassador to the Netherlands visited the cemetery and tweeted photos of the graves.

Neo-Nazis 
The cemetery gets irregular visits from Neonazis. In November 2020, a Belgian woman placed flowers on the grave of the first Dutch SS-volunteer Willem Heubel.

Gallery

Films 
 CEFRG: Deutscher Soldatenfriedhof Ysselsteyn at YouTube.
 Michael Mustermann: Deutscher Soldatenfriedhof Kriegsgräberstätte Ysselsteyn, Niederlande at Youtube.
 Longa Via Est: Duitse Oorlogsbegraafplaats Ysselsteyn (German war cemetery Ysselsteyn) at YouTube.
 Na de bevrijding WO2: 75 jaar vrijheid: oorlogsbegraafplaats Ysselsteyn at Youtube.
 Wolffman325: Deutscher Soldatenfriedhof Ysselsteyn Niederlande. Duitse Militaire begraafplaats at YouTube.
 Omroep Venray: Hans Sakkers: Lezing Duitse Militaire Begraafplaats Ysselsteyn at YouTube.
 The Battlefield Explorer: German War Cemetery Ysselsteyn – Over 30,000 Graves at YouTube.

See also 
 World War II memorials and cemeteries in the Netherlands
 Arnhem Oosterbeek War Cemetery

References

External links 

 
 Ysselsteyn German war cemetery (Deutsche Kriegsgräberstätte Ysselsteyn) at Volksbund Deutsche Kriegsgräberfürsorge 
 Ysselsteyn German war cemetery (Deutscher Soldatenfriedhof Ysselsteyn) 
 Ysselsteyn German war cemetery at tracesofwar
 Find a Grave: Deutscher Soldatenfriedhof Ysselsteyn
 Stichting Kennispunt Mei 1940 – German war cemetery IJsselsteijn
 Youth Meeting Centre Ysselsteyn (Internationale Jugendbegegnungs- und Bildungsstätte Ysselsteyn)

1940s architecture
Cemeteries in Limburg (Netherlands)
Cemeteries in the Netherlands
German War Graves Commission
Venray
World War I memorials
World War II cemeteries in the Netherlands